Radwan  is a rural village.

References

Radwan